"Julius" is a 1994 song by the American band Phish. It is the first track from their 1994 album Hoist and was released as their seventh promotional single by Elektra Records. The song is a blues rock song written by Phish guitarist and lead vocalist Trey Anastasio and lyricist Tom Marshall. The song features backing vocals by Rose Stone, Jean McClain and the Rickey Grundy Chorale and horn instruments by the Tower of Power Horn Section.

The song's lyrics are based on the assassination of Julius Caesar and William Shakespeare's play Julius Caesar.

Track listing

"Julius" (Edit) (Trey Anastasio, Tom Marshall) - 3:43

Personnel
Musicians
Trey Anastasio – guitars, vocals
Page McConnell – keyboards, vocals
Mike Gordon – bass guitar, vocals
Jon Fishman – drums, vocals

Also appears on

Live Phish Volume 13 (2002)
It (DVD) (2004)
Live In Brooklyn (CD/DVD) (2006)Vegas 96 (2007)The Clifford Ball (DVD) (2009)Coral Sky (DVD) (2010)Hampton/Winston-Salem '97 (2011)Chicago '94 (2012)Star Lake 98 (DVD) (2012)Niagara Falls'' (2013)

Notes

Phish songs
Elektra Records singles
Songs written by Trey Anastasio
1995 singles
1994 songs
Songs written by Tom Marshall (singer)
Songs about Julius Caesar